Kanneljärvi may refer to:
 Pobeda, Leningrad Oblast (named Kanneljärvi before 1948)
 Kanneljärvi village, known as Uusikirkko before 1925